Felicity Katherine Sarah Askew (born 19 December 1899) was a British artist, notable for her paintings and sculptures of horses.

Biography
Askew was born at Chelsea in London to John Bertram Askew and Frederick Louisa née Dallas. She studied under William Frank Calderon, Max Kruse and Ernesto Bazzaro. Askew established herself as a painter and sculptor, in bronze, of equestrian and sporting subjects and exhibited works in London, at the Walker Art Gallery in Liverpool and in Paris, including at the Salon des Artistes Francais in 1926. She also exhibited works in Germany, Italy and the United States. Her best known work is Companions of Labour, a bronze group of horses dating from 1926. For many years Askew lived at Newmarket in Suffolk and later, in the 1920s, at Berwick upon Tweed. From Berwick, she exhibited at a number of galleries in the north-east of England and Scotland but appears to have given up her artistic career to take up acting in the 1950s.

References

1899 births
Date of death unknown
20th-century British sculptors
20th-century English women artists
Animal artists
People from Chelsea, London
Sculptors from London